Scythris silfverbergi is a moth of the family Scythrididae. It was described by Bengt Å. Bengtsson in 2014. It is found in Kenya.

References

silfverbergi
Moths described in 2014